Narendra Ramcharaji Deoghare (born 2 May 1922) was an Indian politician who served as a member of the 4th Lok Sabha from the Nagpur constituency of Maharashtra. He was a member of the Indian National Congress (INC) party.

Deoghare attended Govindram Seksaria College of Commerce at Wardha. He was married to Mrs. Shashilabai and had four sons and one daughter and resided at Bhandara Road in Nagpur.

Deoghare was previously associated with the Praja Socialist Party. He was Chairman of Nagpur Resham and Vinkar Cooperative Society during 1956—60 and  Director of Vidarbha Weavers Cooperative Society from 1946 to 1958. He was member of  All India Cottage Industries Board. He worked as  Member of  District Congress Committee, Nagpur Pradesh Congress Committee and All India Congress Committee between    1955 and 1957.

References 

1922 births
Possibly living people
India MPs 1967–1970
Indian National Congress politicians from Maharashtra
Lok Sabha members from Maharashtra
Marathi politicians
Politicians from Nagpur